Sleepytime Gal is a 1942 American comedy film directed by Albert S. Rogell and written by Art Arthur, Albert Duffy and Max Lief. The film stars Judy Canova, Tom Brown, Billy Gilbert, Ruth Terry, Thurston Hall, Elisha Cook Jr., Jerry Lester, Mildred Coles and Harold Huber. The film was released on March 5, 1942, by Republic Pictures.

Plot

Cast  
Judy Canova as Bessie Cobb
Tom Brown as Chick Patterson
Billy Gilbert as Chef Popodopolis
Ruth Terry as Sugar Caston
Thurston Hall as Mr. Adams
Elisha Cook Jr. as Ernie
Jerry Lester as Downbeat
Mildred Coles as Connie Thompson
Harold Huber as Honest Joe Kincaid
Fritz Feld as Chef Petrovich
Frank Sully as Dimples
Jimmy Ames as Gus
Jay Novello as Chef Barzumium
Skinnay Ennis as Danny Marlowe
Paul Fix as Johnny Gatto

References

External links
 

1942 films
1940s English-language films
American comedy films
1942 comedy films
Republic Pictures films
Films directed by Albert S. Rogell
American black-and-white films
1940s American films